Barbara Flynn Currie (born May 3, 1940) is an American politician who served as a Democratic member of the Illinois House of Representatives from 1979 to 2019. She served as the Majority Leader from 1997 to 2019. Flynn Currie's forty years as a member of the Illinois General Assembly is the longest tenure of any woman to serve in the Illinois General Assembly.

Personal life and education
Barbara Flynn grew up in the Hyde Park neighborhood of Chicago. Her father, Frank Flynn, taught at the University of Chicago School of Social Service Administration. She graduated from the University of Chicago Laboratory Schools in 1958, and enrolled at the College of the University of Chicago in the same year. She left the university in 1959 and married David P. Currie. David, a native of Macon, Georgia, had graduated from the college in 1957, and soon enrolled at Harvard Law School. As David was a law student and held jobs as a law clerk, the Curries lived outside Chicago until 1962, when David became an instructor at the University of Chicago Law School. The Curries had two children: Stephen and Margaret.

Currie slowly finished her undergraduate degree at the University of Chicago, balancing her studies with caring for her children. She graduated from the college in 1968, followed by a master's degree in political science from the same university in 1973. She was politically active, working on the campaign for Michael Shakman, a Chicago-based attorney and activist who ran for delegate to the state's 1970 constitutional convention.

Currie is a member of the Chicago League of Women Voters, the Illinois Women's Institute for Leadership, Women United for South Shore, and the Board of the ACLU of Illinois.

House of Representatives
Currie was elected to the Illinois House of Representatives in 1978. She ran in the 24th district, where incumbent Robert E. Mann had announced his retirement. At the time, women comprised only 13% of the General Assembly. In 1997, Currie became the majority leader of the Illinois House of Representatives, the first woman to hold that position. On September 14, 2017, she announced she would not stand for reelection in 2018.

Political positions 
Currie co-sponsored bills that established the Illinois earned income tax credit, repealed capital punishment, and legalized same-sex marriage.

Impeachment of Rod Blagojevich
In December 2008, following the arrest of Illinois Governor Rod Blagojevich, Currie was named by Illinois House Speaker Michael Madigan as the chairperson of the Illinois House committee to investigate Governor Blagojevich for possible impeachment as a result of federal corruption charges against him. Blagojevich was subsequently impeached by the House and removed from office by the Illinois Senate.

Later career 
WBEZ reported that in December 2018, Currie appeared at the top of a "clout list" from an aide to House Speaker Michael Madigan, who had recommended several people to fill roles in the administration of newly-elected Governor J. B. Pritzker.

In April 2019, Pritzker appointed Currie to the Illinois Pollution Control Board. Her husband, David, had created the board 50 years before her appointment, and served as its first chairman. She also served as the board's chairman, earning an annual salary of nearly $124,000. Currie knew that Madigan had recommended her. However, she denied his clout had played a role, instead pointing to her legislative track record and interactions with the governor.

References

External links

Biography, bills and committees at the 98th Illinois General Assembly
Previous sessions: 97th, 96th, 95th, 94th, 93rd
State Representative Barbara Flynn Currie constituency site
 
Profile at OurCampaigns.com
Rep. Barbara Flynn Currie at Illinois House Democrats

  

|-
  

|-
  

|-

1940 births
2000 United States presidential electors
2004 United States presidential electors
2008 United States presidential electors
2016 United States presidential electors
20th-century American women politicians
20th-century American politicians
21st-century American politicians
21st-century American women politicians
Living people
Democratic Party members of the Illinois House of Representatives
Politicians from Chicago
Politicians from La Crosse, Wisconsin
Women state legislators in Illinois